Bari Nizami was a lyricist from West Punjab (Pakistani Punjab).
 Nusrat Fateh Ali Khan, Attaullah Khan Esakhelvi, Noor Jehan and Ghulam Ali sang his qawwalis and songs.

Life 
Barri Nizami (Birth Name: Sheikh Muhammad Saghir son of Sheikh Ghulam Muhammad) was born on 26 December 1937 in Gojra in British Punjab. Gojra now falls under Toba Tek Singh District of West Punjab (Pakistani Punjab). 

He had become friends with Nusrat Fateh Ali Khan.

Death
He died on 14 May 1998 due to lack of money for his treatment, as he was very poor.

Bari Nizami songs by Nusrat Fateh Ali Khan 
His most popular lyrics sung by the legend of Qawwali, Ustad Nusrat Fateh Ali Khan are below:

Mast Mast Dam Mast Qalandar
 Vigar Gai Ae Thore Dina Taun
Yaara Dak Le Khooni Ankhiyan Noon
 Ranjha Te Mera Rabb Warga
Dil Mar Jane Nu Ki Hoya Sajna
Sunn Charkhe Di Mitthi Mitthi Kook
 Ho Jave Je Piyar
 Mailey Ne Vichar Jana
 Wadah Kar ke Sajjan Nahee Aya
 Gin Gin Taare Langhdiya Raata
 Kamli walay Muhammad tu Sadqa mein jan
 Kinna Sohna Teinu Rab Ne Banaya, Dil Karay Vekhda Rahwan

Book 
His poetry was published by a journalist jamil Siraj, Book Name is "QADRAAN".

References

External links
Bari Nizami on IMDb website

Punjabi-language poets
Punjabi-language lyricists
Punjabi people
1937 births
1998 deaths
People from Faisalabad